Kalateh-ye Meydan (also Romanized as Kalāteh-ye Meydān and Kalāteh Meydān) is a village in Sarvelayat Rural District, Sarvelayat District, Nishapur County, Razavi Khorasan Province, Iran. At the 2006 census, its population was 396, in 117 families.

References 

Populated places in Nishapur County